The 1999 Intercontinental Cup was an association football match played on 30 November 1999 between Manchester United, winners of the 1998–99 UEFA Champions League, and Palmeiras, winners of the 1999 Copa Libertadores. The match was played at the neutral venue of the National Stadium in Tokyo in front of 53,372 spectators.

Manchester United won the match 1–0, the winning goal scored by their captain, Roy Keane. This was United's only Intercontinental Cup triumph, having been beaten by Estudiantes in the 1968 competition. This game was Palmeiras' only appearance in the Intercontinental Cup. Ryan Giggs was given the man of the match award. Manchester United's victory made them the first and only team from England and also the British Isles to win the Intercontinental Cup.

Teams

Venue

For the 20th season in a row, as a result of the competition's sponsorship by Toyota, the match was played at a neutral venue, the National Stadium in Tokyo, Japan.

Match

Details

Statistics

See also
1998–99 UEFA Champions League
1999 Copa Libertadores
2000 FIFA Club World Championship
Manchester United F.C. in European football

References

External links
1999 Intercontinental Cup at FIFA.com

1999–2000 in European football
1999 in South American football
1999 in Japanese football
1999
Manchester United F.C. matches
Sociedade Esportiva Palmeiras matches
1999
1999 in Brazilian football
1999–2000 in English football
November 1999 sports events in Asia
1999 in Tokyo
Sports competitions in Tokyo
1999 in association football